Prince is the codename for a family of straight-four 16-valve all-aluminium gasoline engines with variable valve lift and variable valve timing developed by PSA Peugeot Citroën and BMW. It is a compact engine family of 1.4–1.6 L in displacement and includes most modern features such as gasoline direct injection and turbocharger.

The BMW versions of the Prince engine are known as the N13 and the Mini versions are N12 (Double VANOS, Valvetronic 118hp @ 6000rpm) in 2007-2010 Cooper; N14 (Single VANOS, Turbocharged 171hp @ 5500 rpms) in 2007-2010 Cooper-S; N14 (Single VANOS, Turbocharged 208hp @ 6000rpm) in 2009-2013 JCW Cooper; N16 (Double VANOS, Valvetronic 121hp @ 6000rpms) in 2011-2013 Cooper and N18 (Double VANOS, Valvetronic Turbocharged 181hp @ 5500rpm) in 2011-2013 Cooper-S. It replaced the Tritec engine family in the Mini and was first introduced in 2006 for MINI. Later in 2011 also for BMW models F20 and F21 114i, 116i and 118i . This was the first longitudinal engine mount option for Prince engine.

PSA started to use the Prince family in 2006 to replace a part of their TU family (the other part being replaced by the EB engine) — the Peugeot 207 being the first car to receive it.

The engine's components are produced by PSA at their Douvrin, France, facility, with MINI and BMW engine assembly at Hams Hall in Warwickshire, UK.  The co-operation was announced on 23 July 2002 with the first engines produced in 2006. The Prince engine project is not related to the Prince Motor Company.

In late 2006, an extension of the cooperation between the two groups was announced, promising new four-cylinder engines, without further details.

On 29 September 2010, it was announced by BMW that the 1.6Turbo version of the Prince engine would be supplied from 2012 to Saab for use in forthcoming models, primarily the 9-3. However with the closure of SAAB supply never started.

At the Geneva Auto Show 2011, Saab unveiled their latest concept vehicle Saab PhoeniX with BMW Prince Engine 1.6T ;

On 25 June 2014 1.6-litre turbo Prince engine won its eighth consecutive International Engine of the Year Award in the 1.4 to 1.8-litre category. In 2014 the Prince engine beat, among others, the new BMW B38 engine which is replacing the Prince engine in the Mini and BMW lineups.

Design
The Prince family shares its basic block dimensions with the previous PSA TU engine family. Engineering design was directed by BMW using their Valvetronic variable valve lift system on the intake side, flow-controlled oil pump, timing chain, single belt drive of all ancillary units, composite camshafts and cylinder head produced by lost-foam casting. It is also equipped with an on-demand water pump. Gasoline direct injection with a twin-scroll turbocharger will be used on the higher power versions.

All Prince engines will share  cylinder bore spacing, with  bore. The engine features a two-piece "bedplate" aluminum crankcase for extra stiffness.

litre  EP3/EP3C (PSA)

Applications:
 2005–2014 Peugeot 207
 2007–2010 Mini One
 2007–2013 Peugeot 308 (308 CC until 2015)
 2009–2013 Citroën C3
 2009–2017 Citroën C3 Picasso
 2009–2012 Citroën DS3
 2012–2015 Peugeot 208

litre EP6/EP6C naturally aspirated (PSA)
The 1.6 L engine is used in the second-generation MINI and various Peugeot 207 models.

The naturally aspirated variant (EP6, EP6C) has conventional fuel injection and lost-foam cast cylinder heads.

Applications:
 2007–2012 Peugeot 207 Sport
 2007–2015 Mini Cooper
 2007–2014 Mini One
 2012–2015 Peugeot 208
 2013–2015 Peugeot 2008
 2007–2013 Peugeot 308 (308 CC until 2015)
 2010–2015 Peugeot 3008
 2011–2015 Peugeot 508
 2008–2014 Citroën C4
 2009–2016 DS 3
 2009–2015 DS 4
 2009–2014 Citroën C3
 2009–2017 Citroën C3 Picasso

1.6 litre charged (PSA)
The turbocharged 1.6 L unit adds gasoline direct injection and has special low-pressure die-cast heads.

At first, there were two versions on offer – the THP150 and THP175, also known as the EP6DT and EP6DTS respectively within Peugeot. The first was later updated as EP6CDT and also as THP163, EP6CDTM. There is also EP6CDT MD – with lowered compression ratio.

Applications:
 2006–2014 Peugeot 207 CC/GT
 2007–present Peugeot 308
 2011–present Peugeot 508
 2010–present Peugeot RCZ (THP156)
 2008–present Citroën C4
 2008–present Citroën C4 Picasso
 2008–present Citroën Grand C4 Picasso
 2013– Citroën C4 Sedan – the car assembled in Russia, Kaluga 
 2009–2019 DS 3
 2010–2018 DS 4
 2012–2018 DS 5
 2011–present Peugeot 408 Sport
 2012–present Peugeot 208

Applications:
 2011–present Peugeot 408
 2015–present Citroën C4 Grand Picasso
 2016–present Peugeot 3008
 2017–present Peugeot 5008
 2018–present Citroën C4 Cactus (for Argentina, Brazil and some Latin American markets)

Applications:
 2006–2010 Peugeot 207 RC
 2007–2010 Mini Cooper S
 2007–2011 Mini John Cooper Works ( – only used by BMW)
 2008–present Peugeot 308
 2010–201? Citroën DS3 Racing – EP6CDTS – 202 hp

It featured direct injection, twin-scroll turbocharger and Valvetronic variable valve lift. It was first introduced in the Peugeot RCZ sport compact for the 2010 model year, where it generates .

Applications:
 2010–2015 Peugeot RCZ
 2010–2013 Peugeot 308 GTi
 2010-2018 DS 4
 2012–2019 Peugeot 208 GTi
 2021–present Peugeot 3008 GT Hybrid4

PSA has now released a new Euro 6 engine based on the THP in the following Engine codes:

 EP6FDT –  Peugeot 508 Puretech 180, Peugeot 3008 Puretech 180, DS 7 Crossback Puretech 180, Citroën C5 Aircross PureTech 180
 EP6FDTX – // 1.6l THP Peugeot 208 GTi
 EP6FDT –  Peugeot 508 Puretech 225, Peugeot 3008 Hybrid4 225, DS 7 Crossback E-Tense 225, Secma F16 Turbo
 EP6FDTR – / 1.6l THP Peugeot 308 GTi
 EP6CDTR –  1.6l THP Peugeot RCZ

BMW N13 version 
The turbocharged 1.6 litre version used by BMW is called the BMW N13. The N13 replaced the naturally aspirated BMW N43 engine and was produced from 2011 to 2016. It is BMW's first turbocharged four-cylinder petrol engine since the BMW 2002 Turbo ceased production in 1974.

BMW sold the N13 alongside the larger displacement BMW N20 turbocharged four-cylinder engine. The N13 was effectively replaced by the turbocharged three-cylinder BMW B38 engine.

Applications:

75 kW version
 2012–2015 BMW 1 Series (F20) 114i

100 kW version
 2011–2015 BMW 1 Series (F20) 116i
 2012–2015 BMW 3 Series (F30) 316i

125 kW version
 2011–2015 BMW 1 Series (F20) 118i
 2012–2015 BMW 3 Series (F30) 320i 

130 kW version
 2015–2016 BMW 1 Series (F20) 120i

Mini N14 and N18 versions 
The turbocharged 1.6 litre versions used by Mini are called the Mini N14 and Mini N18. The N18 succeeded the N14 and had double Vanos. The N14/N18 engine uses direct injection, a twin-scroll turbocharger and Valvetronic (variable valve lift).

Issues 
There has been several cases of recalls and/or extended warranty due to failing HPFP (high pressure fuel pumps) in the Prince engine 

There was a service bulletin issued in 2013 due to failing timing chains and timing chain tensioner, both designed by BMW, in the Prince engine

Production
The production of MINI version of 'Prince' family of engines is set to end by 2016, and be replaced by its very latest 3 and 4 cylinder Engine family –  BMW B37, BMW B38 and BMW B48.

In 2015 it was announced, on the Hong Kong Stock exchange, that BMW had signed an IPR deal with XCE. They will make the N18 TVDI engine in China for use in various Brilliance Automotive vehicles (JV Partner of BMW in China) and also for other China OEM's.

PSA will continue to develop the higher power models of the engine family, with future production planned for China with its JV partners DONFENG (DPCA) and Changan（CAPSA）.

References

Bibliography
 

Française de Mécanique engines
PSA engines
BMW engines
Straight-four engines
Gasoline engines by model